Dorval  is an on-island suburban city on the island of Montreal in southwestern Quebec, Canada. In 2016, the Canadian Census indicated that the population increased by 4.2% to 18,980. Although the city has the largest surface area in Montréal’s west side, it is among the least densely populated. Montréal–Pierre Elliott Trudeau International Airport constitutes about 60% of the city's land, forcing all of Dorval's population to be concentrated in the southern part of the city.

Dorval is the oldest city in the west side of Montréal, having been founded in 1667, and one of the oldest in Canada and North America.

History
The history of Dorval dates back more than 350 years to 1665 when Sulpician priests established a mission on the outskirts of Ville-Marie, a French settlement which later became known as Montreal.  Dorval was originally named Gentilly. It was later renamed La Présentation-de-la-Vierge-Marie. In 1691, the domain of La Présentation, originally owned by Pierre Le Gardeur de Repentigny, was acquired by Jean-Baptiste Bouchard dit d'Orval. "d'Orval" (French for "of Orval") was added to Bouchard's name by his father Claude in reference his birthplace Orval in Montigny-Lengrain, France.  It was incorporated as a village in 1892, a town in 1903, and a city in 1956 (in French it was termed a cité, an Old French term from which the English legal term "city" originates).

As with many other settlements on the island of Montreal, the Grand Trunk Railway, which came to Dorval in 1855, was highly instrumental in attracting many wealthier families, mostly English-speaking, in search of a summer refuge in proximity to their downtown residence and place of work. Access to Dorval from Montreal was also facilitated by the extension of streetcar service to Dorval's eastern city limits in the interwar period.

After the Second World War many middle-class families migrated to Dorval from the city of Montreal and from other parts of Canada. This migration was made possible by the widening of highway 20 and by the large-scale construction of new dwellings.  This new housing consisted mostly of single family homes with some townhouses and low-rise apartment buildings, built on lands previously used for agriculture and recreational activities. The post-war period also saw the construction of Dorval Gardens shopping centre in 1954, one of Greater Montreal's first mall-style shopping centres. Today the shopping centre remains the city's principal centre of retail trade.

The island named Dorval Island, settled in 1860 and located less than one kilometre offshore from Dorval, constitutes the separate city of L'Île-Dorval despite being a summer cottage community with only five permanent residents as of the Canada 2011 Census.  The island is connected to the city of Dorval by a private ferry service.

On 1 January 2002, as part of the 2002–2006 municipal reorganization of Montreal, Dorval was merged into the city of Montreal, being combined with L'Île-Dorval to form the Dorval–L'Île-Dorval borough of Montreal.  After a change of government and a 2004 referendum, Dorval was reconstituted as a city on 1 January 2006. Although Dorval had the legal status of cité prior to the merger, the reconstituted city has the status of ville (see Types of municipalities in Quebec).  Nevertheless, the municipal government refers to itself as the "Cité de Dorval".

Demographics 

Economy
Air Inuit and La Senza have their headquarters in Dorval. Bombardier Inc. houses the headquarters of its Bombardier Aerospace division in Dorval.

Previously Inter-Canadien had its headquarters in Dorval.

Air Canada Centre, the headquarters of Air Canada, are located on the grounds of Montréal-Pierre Elliott Trudeau International Airport and in Saint-Laurent, Montreal, near Dorval.

Local government

List of former mayors:

 Désiré H. Girouard (1892–1893)
 James B. Allan (1893–1894)
 Benjamin Décarie (1894–1895)
 Hartland St. Clair MacDougall (1895)
 Charles Décarie (1895–1896)
 Robert FitzGibbon (1896–1897)
 Joseph Dosithée Legault Deslauriés (1897–1899)
 William de Montmolin Marler (1899–1901)
 Jean-Baptiste Meloche (1901–1903)
 Harry Markland Molson (1903–1905)
 Amable Lallemand (1905–1907)
 Anthony Haig Sims (1907–1909)
 Benjamin Décarie (1909–1911)
 William A. C. Hamilton (1911–1913)
 Joseph Leroux (1913–1915)
 Charles-C. Décarie (1915–1923)
 Harvey Thompson (1923–1925)
 Avila Décarie (1925–1927)
 E.-Raphaël Chadillon (1927–1933)
 Arthur Cecil Comber (1933–1937, 1941–1943)
 J. Arthur Lajoie (1937–1939)
 Ernest H. Décarie (1939–1941)
 Joseph Ovila Adrien Valois (1943–1947)
 Stanley Mason Elliot (1947–1948)
 Oliva Cardinal (1948–1955)
 Robert John Pratt (1955–1964)
 Sarto Desnoyers (1964–1982)
 Peter Blyth Yeomans (1982–2002)
 Edgar Rouleau (2002–2021)
 Marc Doret (2021–present)

Infrastructure
Aéroports de Montréal, the Greater Montreal airport authority, has its headquarters in Leigh-Capreol Place (French: place Leigh-Capreol) in Dorval.

Trudeau Airport

Most of Montreal's principal airport, Pierre Elliott Trudeau International Airport (previously known as Dorval Airport), is in Dorval. Originally a military airfield used mainly to refuel new fighters and bombers being flown to Great Britain during the Second World War, Trudeau Airport today serves over 18 million passengers annually.

Education
The Centre de services scolaire Marguerite-Bourgeoys operates Francophone public schools, but were previously operated by the Commission scolaire Marguerite-Bourgeoys until 15 June 2020. The change was a result of a law passed by the Quebec government that changed the school board system from denominational to linguistic.

Schools include:
 Centre d'éducation des adultes Jeanne-Sauvé (adult school)
 École secondaire Dorval-Jean-XXIII (secondary school)
 École primaire Gentilly (primary school)

The Lester B. Pearson School Board (LBPSB) operates Anglophone public schools.
 Dorval Elementary School, formerly known as Courtland Park Elementary School until 2006.

Notable residents

 Jason Demers (born 1988), NHL ice hockey player

See also

 Dorval bus terminus
 Dorval intercity station
 Dorval station
 List of former boroughs
 Montreal Merger
 Municipal reorganization in Quebec

References

External links

 

 
Cities and towns in Quebec
Quebec populated places on the Saint Lawrence River
1667 establishments in the French colonial empire
Populated places established in 1667
Island of Montreal municipalities